Mike Edwards (born May 18, 1996) is an American football safety for the Kansas City Chiefs of the National Football League (NFL). He played college football at Kentucky, and was selected in the third round of the 2019 NFL Draft by the Buccaneers.

Professional career

Tampa Bay Buccaneers

2019 season
Edwards was drafted by the Tampa Bay Buccaneers in the third round of 2019 NFL Draft with the 99th overall pick.

2020 season
In Week 3 against the Denver Broncos, Edwards recorded his first career interception off a pass thrown by Brett Rypien late in the fourth quarter to secure a 28–10 Buccaneers win.

In the Divisional Round of the playoffs against the New Orleans Saints, Edwards intercepted a pass thrown by Drew Brees during the 30–20 win. Edwards earned his first Super Bowl ring when the Buccaneers defeated the Kansas City Chiefs in Super Bowl LV.

2021 season
In Week 2 against the Atlanta Falcons, Edwards recorded four tackles, three pass deflections, and two interceptions returned for touchdowns from Matt Ryan in a 48–25 win. As a result of his performance in Week 2, Edwards was named NFC Defensive Player of the Week. On December 2, 2021, Edwards was suspended for three games by the NFL for violating the league's COVID-19 protocols, specifically for misrepresenting his vaccination status.

Kansas City Chiefs
Edwards signed with the Kansas City Chiefs on March 20, 2023.

References

External links
Tampa Bay Buccaneers bio
Kentucky Wildcats bio

 

1996 births
Living people
American football safeties
Kentucky Wildcats football players
Players of American football from Cincinnati
Tampa Bay Buccaneers players
Kansas City Chiefs players